Ali Selmi is a football manager from Tunisia.

In the 1998 FIFA World Cup finals, he took charge of the Tunisia national football team for their final group match, after original manager Henryk Kasperczak was fired after two losses and saw the team eliminated from contention. Tunisia played Romania to a 1-1 draw in that match. Selmi himself was fired shortly thereafter. He has later coached AS Marsa.

References

Year of birth missing (living people)
Living people
Tunisian football managers
Tunisia national football team managers
1998 FIFA World Cup managers
AS Marsa managers